The men's decathlon event at the 2008 World Junior Championships in Athletics was held in Bydgoszcz, Poland, at Zawisza Stadium on 9 and 10 July.  Junior implements were used, i.e. 99.0 cm (3'3) hurdles, 6 kg shot and 1.75 kg discus.

Medalists

Results

Final
9/10 July

Participation
According to an unofficial count, 19 athletes from 13 countries participated in the event.

References

Decathlon
Combined events at the World Athletics U20 Championships